Transportation Management Association of Chester County (TMACC), is a public transportation agency designated by the Pennsylvania Department of Transportation to oversee transportation needs of Chester County, Pennsylvania.  According to the website, the organization provides services to facilitate car pools, van pools, and bus shuttles.  The organization works closely with other organizations such as SEPTA, Krapf Transit and the Delaware Valley Regional Planning Commission.

Bus service
Regular mass transit services under the name "ChescoBus" include:
 SCCOOT - bus service operated by Krapf Transit and managed by TMACC that runs Monday through Friday between West Chester and Oxford.
 Coatesville Link - bus service operated by Krapf Transit and managed by TMACC that runs Monday through Saturday between Coatesville and Parkesburg.
 The Outfitter - bus service operated by Krapf Transit and managed by TMACC that runs daily between Coatesville and the Urban Outfitters distribution center in Gap.
 RideECO - a commuter solution customized for employees of organizations

Former service:
 Krapf "A" -  bus service operated and managed by Krapf Transit that ran Monday through Sunday linking Coatesville with West Chester and Exton.  The route handled 1,200 daily passengers on an old SEPTA 120 bus route. On August 1, 2021, the route was replaced with SEPTA Route 135.
Evening Link - bus service operated by Krapf Transit and managed by TMACC that ran on evenings Monday through Saturday between Coatesville and Exton.

History
The agency was created in May 1992 as the Chester Valley TMA, with 14 founding members. In June 1995, the name was changed to TMACC to better attract members from across the county. In 2015, TMACC rebranded their buses to be green color and adopted the name "ChescoBus" for their bus routes; TMACC also installed new bus stop signs. This was part of a move to attract riders to the routes, which serve portions of Chester County where mass transit is limited. In 2015, Saturday service was restored to the agency's SCCOOT and Coatesville Link services. Saturday service on SCCOOT was later dropped.

References

External links
TMACC official website

Bus transportation in Pennsylvania
Special administrative structures in the United States
Municipal authorities in Pennsylvania
Transportation in Chester County, Pennsylvania
Paratransit services in the United States